CIMEA is an acronym that may refer to:

Information Centre on Academic Mobility and Equivalence, 
International Committee of Children's and Adolescents' Movements